is a Japanese manga artist, best known for his series Black Cat (2000–2004) and for illustrating To Love Ru (2006–2009) and To Love Ru Darkness (2010–2017) alongside author Saki Hasemi. Currently, Yabuki writes and illustrates the series Ayakashi Triangle (2020–present). His mentor was Takeshi Obata, the illustrator of Hikaru no Go, Death Note and Bakuman.

Overview
Yabuki has stated that everything he learned about drawing manga, he learned from Akira Toriyama's Dragon Ball. He even admitted that his first publication in Jump was not his own work but actually an illustration combining, or rather fusing together, its characters Gohan and Trunks that he sent in to a 1995 contest and won a prize for. Yabuki was an extra in the 2003 movie Godzilla: Tokyo S.O.S., running through the streets of Roppongi Hills.

Yabuki's first popular series, Black Cat, was serialized in Weekly Shōnen Jump between July 2000 and June 2004. It sold over 12 million copies in Japan and was adapted into an anime television series by Gonzo. Both were released in North America. Upon its ending, Yabuki expressed desire to make a sequel or make its characters reappear in another work. Yabuki then teamed up with Saki Hasemi and illustrated the Weekly Shōnen Jump series To Love Ru (2006–2009) while Hasemi wrote it. It was released in North America and adapted into several anime television series and original video animations (OVAs), which have also been released internationally.

In January 2010, Yabuki began illustrating a manga adaptation of Tomohiro Matsu's Mayoi Neko Overrun! light novel series for Jump SQ. before it changed to Jump SQ.19 in May 2010. At the end of the year, Yabuki and Hasemi began To Love Ru Darkness in Jump SQ.. In August 2011 the editorial department suddenly announced that Mayoi Neko Overrun! had ended without giving an explanation. To Love Ru Darkness ran until 2017 and, like the original, the sequel series was released in North America and adapted into several anime television series and OVAs, which have also been released internationally. Together, the To Love Ru and To Love Ru Darkness manga series have over 16 million copies in circulation.

In 2014, Yabuki began providing the illustrations for a different Matsu light novel series, Hatena Illusion. But the fourth installment released in November 2015 became the last due to Matsu's death in 2016. However, a series titled Hatena Illusion R began in 2019, and Yabuki continues his role as illustrator of the novels. From 2018 to 2020, he illustrated a manga adaptation of the Darling in the Franxx anime for the Shōnen Jump+ website and app. Yabuki launched the manga series Ayakashi Triangle in the June 15, 2020 issue of Weekly Shōnen Jump. On April 25, 2022, the series transferred to Shōnen Jump+.

Personal life
Yabuki said he was born in Okayama but "formed [his] personality" in Kōchi. Yabuki and his first wife were divorced as of June 2009. They have a daughter. In August 2015, Yabuki announced in the September 2015 issue of Jump SQ. that he had gotten remarried. He is the brother-in-law of fellow manga artist Kenta Shinohara. In June 2022, Yabuki announced the birth of his son.

Works

Manga
 
 
 
  – Illustrator, written by Saki Hasemi
  – Illustrator, written by Tomohiro Matsu
 
  – Illustrator, written by Saki Hasemi
  – Illustrator, written by Code:000

Other work
  – Illustrations, light novel written by Kaya Kizaki
  – Illustrations, light novel series written by Tomohiro Matsu
  – Illustrations, light novel series written by Tomohiro Matsu and StoryWorks

References

External links
 
 

1980 births
Living people
Manga artists from Okayama Prefecture